Šulinkatte was a Hittite god of Hattian origin. He was regarded as a war deity. Additionally, he could fulfill the role of a protector of palaces and houses. In the local tradition of Nerik, he was regarded as the father of the weather god of Nerik. He first appears in texts dated to the fifteenth or fourteenth century BCE. His main cult center was the sparsely attested city Tamarmara, but he was also worshiped elsewhere in ancient Anatolia, for example in Hattusa and Nerik. Fragments of a Hattic song celebrating him are also known.

Name and character
The theonym Šulinkatte has Hattic origin. It consists of the words katte, "king", and šuli, of unknown meaning, and presumably can be translated as "king of šuli". It could be represented by the logogram dU.GUR. On this basis it has been proposed that the first part of his name can be interpreted as "sword", but this view found no widespread support. The writing dZA.BA4.BA4 is also attested.

Šulinkatte was a war god. He shared this role with many other deities in the Hittite pantheon, including fellow Hattian god Wurunkatte, Hittite Zappana and Iyarri, Hurrian Aštabi, Ḫešui, Nupatik and Tašmišu, Mesopotamian Nergal and Ugur and more. He was also believed to be the protective god of the royal palace, responsible for warding off demons. Various Hittite texts indicate that he might have more broadly played the role of protector of palaces, houses and gates. 

According to a preserved description of a statue of Šulinkatte, he could be depicted standing on a lion, with a sword in one hand and a man s chopped off head in the other. This iconography reflects his character as a warlike god. He was portrayed as a young man according to the text KUB 57.105.

Associations with other deities
In the local tradition of Nerik, Šulinkatte and the sun goddess of the Earth were regarded as the parents of the weather god of Nerik. A deity named Šulinkattainu, whose name is a combination of the theonym Šulinkatte and a Hattic diminutive suffix, is also known, and might also plausibly be his child. Volkert Haas suggested he should be identified with Taru, who he presumed was identical with the god from Nerik. This view is supported by other Hittitologists as well. 

Worship
Oldest known attestations of Šulinkatte, such as the text CTH 516.B, come from the fifteenth or fourteenth century BCE. His main cult center was the sparsely attested city Tamarmara, located in central Anatolia. The tablet CTH 516 is a ritual focused on him originating in this city, attributed to the priest Tarḫini. He had two festivals in this city as well, one in the beginning of the year and another in fall.  

Šulinkatte's cult had a supraregional character. He was worshiped in Hattusa. During the   festival, a celebration focused on him took place in the shrine of DINGIR.MAḪ. According to Manfred Hutter, a degree of overlay between these two gods only begins in the thirteenth century BCE. In Ḫanḫana and Kašḫa Šulinkatte was one of the twelve deities who were represented in the form of a ḫuwaši stele during a festival dedicated to Telipinu. He also appears in a similar listing connected to a ceremony from Zalpa.

A line from a praise song attributed the "women of Nerik" dedicated to Šulinkatte, written in Hattic, is also known, though only a few words can be translated with certainty, including katte ("king"), izzi ("auspicious") and karam ("wine").

References

Bibliography

Hittite deities
Hattian deities
War gods
Domestic and hearth deities